Blueboy were an indie pop band formed in Reading, Berkshire who were signed to Sarah Records and later Shinkansen Recordings. Core members Keith Girdler and Paul Stewart also recorded as Arabesque and Beaumont.

History
Blueboy formed around 1989 and initially consisted of Keith Girdler (on vocals) and Paul Stewart (on guitars), formerly of little-known band Feverfew. They soon signed to Sarah Records, releasing the home-recorded single "Clearer" in 1991, and took on more members, including singer/cellist Gemma Townley and second guitarist Harvey Williams (of The Field Mice/Another Sunny Day). "Clearer" was followed by several singles and two albums on Sarah, If Wishes Were Horses and Unisex.  In October 1994, Blueboy recorded a session for John Peel's BBC Radio 1 show. Their final release, The Bank of England, was released in 1998 on Sarah head Matt Haynes' new label, Shinkansen Recordings. By then, Girdler and Stewart were the only original members of the band. Girdler and Stewart were also involved in two other bands, Arabesque and Beaumont, and Girdler also recorded with Lovejoy. Townley later joined Trembling Blue Stars, as did Williams.

Keith Girdler was diagnosed with cancer in 2004 and he died on 15 May 2007. Prior to his death he was working as volunteer manager for Age Concern in Eastbourne.

In 2008, Siesta Records issued a compilation album called Country Music (Songs for Keith Girdler). The compilation was put together by Richard Preece (of Lovejoy) to raise money for the Martletts Hospice in Hove who cared for Girdler.

In 2018, Blueboy's music was released to Bandcamp as part of the release of all the Sarah Records back-catalogue. 

In April 2020, due to the COVID-19 pandemic, Paul Stewart recorded acoustic versions of some Blueboy songs and posted them to the "OfficialBlueboy" Youtube channel to connect with those interested in the band.

Discography

Albums

Singles
"Clearer" (1991), Sarah
"Popkiss" (1992), Sarah
"Cloud Babies" (1993), Sarah - flexi-disc
"Meet Johnny Rave" (1993), Sarah
Some Gorgeous Accident EP (1993), Sarah
"River" (1994), Sarah
Bikini EP (1995), Aquavinyle
"Dirty Mags" (1995), Sarah
"Love Yourself" (1996), Shinkansen
Marco Polo EP (1998), Shinkansen

Compilations
Speedboat (1993 - Quattro Records)

Discography as Arabesque
Roma EP EP (1995), Siesta
The Grooming Gambit EP (1997), Siesta

Discography as Beaumont
This Is... (2000), Siesta
Discotheque a la Carte (2001), Siesta
Tiara (2003), Siesta
No Time Like The Past (2005), Siesta

Compilation album appearances
Grimsby Fishmarket 4 Norrkoeping 0, featured "Chelsea Guitar"
In This Place Called Nowhere (1992) Quattro, featured "Clearer"
Sound of Music - An Anti-Racist Benefit (1993) Bring on Bull, featured "My Favourite Things"
La Rue du Chat Qui Pêche (1993) Sarah/Quattro, featured "Elle" and "Air France"
Gaol Ferry Bridge (1994) Sarah, featured "Try Happiness" and "Air France"
Engine Common (1995) Sarah, featured "Clearer" and "Popkiss"
Battery Point (1995) Sarah, featured "Dirty Mags", "River", and "Toulouse"
There and Back Again Lane (1995) Sarah, featured "The Joy of Living"
PREGO! The Menu of Trattoria (1995) Trattoria, featured "My Favourite Things"
Country Music: Songs for Keith Girdler (2008) Siesta, featured "80's Diaries"

References

External links
Unofficial Blueboy band web site
Blueboy band on TweeNet
Blueboy releases on Sarah Records
Blueboy at discogs.com
Blueboy's bandcamp page

English pop music groups
British indie pop groups
Musical groups from Reading, Berkshire
Sarah Records artists